Otto Stern was also the pen name of German women's rights activist Louise Otto-Peters (1819–1895).

Otto Stern (17 February 1888 – 17 August 1969) was a German-American physicist and Nobel laureate in physics. He was the second most nominated person for a Nobel Prize with 82 nominations in the years 1925–1945 (most times nominated is Arnold Sommerfeld with 84 nominations), ultimately winning in 1943.

Biography

Stern was born into a Jewish family in Sohrau (now Żory) in the Province of Silesia, the German Empire's Kingdom of Prussia. His father was Oskar Stern (1850-1919), a mill owner, who had been living in Breslau (now Wrocław) since 1892. His mother Eugenia née Rosenthal (1863-1907) was from Rawitsch (now Rawicz) in the Prussian Province of Posen. Otto Stern had a brother, Kurt, who became a noted botanist in Frankfurt, and three sisters. He studied in Freiburg im Breisgau, Munich and Breslau.

Stern completed his studies at the University of Breslau in 1912 with a doctoral dissertation in physical chemistry under supervision of Otto Sackur on the  kinetic  theory  of  osmotic  pressure  in  concentrated  solutions. He then followed Albert Einstein to Charles University in Prague and in 1913 to ETH Zurich. Stern served in World War I doing meteorological work on the Russian front while still continuing his studies and in 1915 received his Habilitation at the University of Frankfurt. In 1921 he became a professor at the University of Rostock which he left in 1923 to become director of the newly founded Institut für Physikalische Chemie at the University of Hamburg.

After resigning from his post at the University of Hamburg in 1933 because of the Nazis' Machtergreifung (seizure of power), he found refuge in the city of Pittsburgh becoming a professor of physics at the Carnegie Institute of Technology. During the 1930s, he was a visiting professor at the University of California, Berkeley.

As an experimental physicist Stern contributed to the discovery of spin quantization in the Stern–Gerlach experiment with Walther Gerlach in February 1922 at the Physikalischer Verein in Frankfurt am Main; demonstration of the wave nature of atoms and molecules; measurement of atomic magnetic moments; discovery of the proton's magnetic moment; and development of the molecular beam method which is utilized for the technique of molecular beam epitaxy.

He was awarded the 1943 Nobel Prize in Physics, the first to be awarded since 1939. It was awarded to Stern alone, "for his contribution to the development of the molecular ray method and his discovery of the magnetic moment of the proton" (not for the Stern–Gerlach experiment). The 1943 prize was actually awarded in 1944.

After Stern retired from the Carnegie Institute of Technology, he moved to Berkeley, California. He was a regular visitor to the Physics colloquium at UC Berkeley. He died of a heart attack in Berkeley on 17 August 1969.

The Stern-Gerlach-Medaille of the Deutsche Physikalische Gesellschaft awarded for excellence in experimental physics is named after him and Gerlach.

His niece was the crystallographer Lieselotte Templeton.

See also
 List of German inventors and discoverers

References

Sources 
 Horst Schmidt-Böcking and Karin Reich: Otto Stern. Physiker Querdenker, Nobelpreisträger. Societäts-Verlag, Frankfurt am Main 2011, .
 
 National Academy of Sciences - Otto Stern (englisch; PDF; 1,0 MB)

External links

 Otto Stern, Nobel Luminaries - Jewish Nobel Prize Winners, on the Beit Hatfutsot-The Museum of the Jewish People Website.
 
Stern's publication on his molecular beam method
 Otto Stern School Frankfurt am Main, Germany

1888 births
1969 deaths
20th-century German  physicists
People from Żory
Academic staff of ETH Zurich
Experimental physicists
People from the Province of Silesia
Silesian Jews
Jewish emigrants from Nazi Germany to the United States
Jewish physicists
Nobel laureates in Physics
German Nobel laureates
University of California, Berkeley faculty
Carnegie Mellon University faculty
Academic staff of the University of Rostock
University of Breslau alumni
Goethe University Frankfurt alumni
Academic staff of the University of Hamburg